Eastview is an extinct town in northeastern Taney County, in the Ozarks of southwest Missouri. The location is along a ridge occupied by Farm Road 147 which is a portion of the scenic Glade Top Trail within the Mark Twain National Forest.

A post office called Eastview was established in 1901, and remained in operation until 1928. The community was so named on account of its lofty elevation.

References

Unincorporated communities in Taney County, Missouri
Unincorporated communities in Missouri